Nikolaos Kalogeropoulos (23 July 1851 – 7 January 1927) was a Greek politician and briefly Prime Minister of Greece.

Biography
Kalogeropoulos was born in Chalkida, Euboea, and studied law in Athens and Paris. He was elected a member of the Hellenic Parliament a total of ten times representing Euboea and served as minister in several conservative governments. He was associated with the People's Party after its formation in 1920.

He briefly served as Prime Minister twice. He died in Athens on 7 January 1927 at the age of 75.

References

1851 births
1927 deaths
20th-century prime ministers of Greece
People from Chalcis
People's Party (Greece) politicians
Prime Ministers of Greece
Greek people of the Greco-Turkish War (1919–1922)
Justice ministers of Greece